The Nature Conservancy (TNC) is a global environmental organization headquartered in Arlington, Virginia.  it works via affiliates or branches in 79 countries and territories, as well as across every state in the US.

History
The Nature Conservancy developed out of a scholarly organization initially known as the Ecological Society of America (ESA). The ESA was founded in 1915, and later formed a Committee on Preservation of Natural Areas for Ecological Study, headed by Victor Shelford. The primary aim of Shelford was to find areas of land that would be beneficial for long-term research. By the 1930s, Shelford and his colleagues such as Aldo Leopold increasingly sought to advocate for conservation. The divide in viewpoints regarding scholarship or advocacy led the Society to dissolve the committee and in 1946, Shelford and his colleagues formed the Ecologists' Union. The latter group eventually took the name "The Nature Conservancy", in emulation of the British agency of that name, which pursued a mission of conserving open space and wildlife preserves. The Nature Conservancy was incorporated in the United States as a non-profit organization on October 22, 1951.

As the organization grew, the organization focused largely on buying as much land as possible in the name of conservation with little scientific research conducted on land before being purchased. Patrick Noonan served as President from 1973 to 1980 and spearheaded major land acquisitions, fundraising and decentralized growth of state programs. In 1970 the organization hired its first staff scientist, Robert E. Jenkins Jr., who helped the organization refocus its mission to conserving natural diversity. With Noonan's support, in 1974 Jenkins began to partner with state governments to develop state-by-state inventories which assembled and stored data on the "elements" of nature (e.g. rare species and natural communities) and on "element occurrences" (the specific locations where they occur), which later morphed into the Natural Heritage Network, a network of state natural heritage programs.

Land deals controversy
In 2003 the Washington Post ran an investigative series about the Nature Conservancy with allegations of improper dealing and other improprieties that the Nature Conservancy contested. In part, the Post alleged the Conservancy had, time and again, bought ecologically significant tracts of land, attached some development restrictions and then resold the properties to trustees and supporters at greatly reduced prices. The sales were part of a program that limits intrusive development but generally allows buyers to build homes on the land. The buyers then gave the Conservancy cash that was roughly equivalent to the amount of the discounts. That allowed the new owners to take significant tax deductions for charitable gifts.

The Nature Conservancy suspended a range of practices shortly after the articles ran including these sales, licensing its logo to corporations whose executives sat on the Conservancy's governing board and council, all new logging and other "resource extraction activities" such as oil and gas drilling on its nature preserves, and all new loans to employees. The Conservancy launched an independent review that issued its final report in 2004, calling for sweeping reforms aimed at making the  Conservancy a model of ethical standards for nonprofit organizations.

Sexual harassment investigation
After service as The Nature Conservancy's president for one year, Brian McPeek resigned on May 31, 2019, after a report on an internal investigation of sexual harassment was revealed by Politico and two other senior executives were ultimately dismissed based on its findings. On June 7, 2019, Mark Tercek, CEO since 2008, announced his resignation following the resignation of McPeek. On June 10, Luis Solorzano, executive director of The Nature Conservancy's Florida-based Caribbean chapter, became the fifth senior official to depart the organization. On June 11, The Nature Conservancy's board chairman Thomas J. Tierney announced that board member and former US Secretary of the Interior Sally Jewell would serve as interim CEO, effective September 2019.

Project sites

The Nature Conservancy's efforts include conservation in North America, Central America, and South America, Africa, the Pacific Rim, the Caribbean, and Asia.

North America: selected projects 
The Nature Conservancy and its conservation partner, Pronatura Peninsula Yucatán, to halt deforestation on private lands in and around the 1.8 million acre (7,300 km2) Calakmul Biosphere Reserve, along the Guatemala–Mexico border.  They brokered the protection of 370,000 acres (1,500 km2) of tropical forest in Calakmul.

In another program, TNC is working to protect wildlife habitat in the Greater Yellowstone Ecosystem.

In 2007, the Nature Conservancy made a  purchase of New York forestland from Finch Paper Holdings LLC for $110 million, its largest purchase ever in that state.
The purchase, known as the Montana Legacy Project, is part of an effort to keep these forests in productive timber management and protect the area's clean water and abundant fish and wildlife habitat, while promoting continued public access to these lands for fishing, hiking, hunting and other recreational pursuits. As a follow-on, in 2015 The Nature Conservancy made a $134 million transaction to purchase 165,073 acres – 257 square miles – of forests, rivers and wildlife habitat in the Cascade Mountain Range of Washington and in the Blackfoot River Valley in Montana.
The Conservancy also acquired this land from Plum Creek, including 47,921 acres in the Yakima River Headwaters in Washington and 117,152 acres in the Lower Blackfoot River Watershed in Montana.

Nature United is the Canadian affiliate of The Nature Conservancy. Nature United was founded as a Canadian charity in 2014, building on decades of conservation in Canada. Headquartered in Toronto, the organization has field staff located across the country. Nature United supports Indigenous leadership, sustainable economic development, and large-scale conservation, primarily in the Great Bear Rainforest, Clayoquot Sound, the Northwest Territories, and northern Manitoba.

Africa 
In December 2015, The Nature Conservancy announced the finalization of the first ever debt swap in Seychelles aimed at ocean conservation. The new protected area increases the country's marine protected waters from less than 1 percent to more than 30 percent including support for the creation of the second largest Marine Protected Area in the Western Indian Ocean. The debt swap deal was made possible through a partnership with the Seychelles Ministry of Finance, support of debt-holding nations including France, and grants from private organizations led by the Leonardo DiCaprio Foundation.

Financing for this effort was organized by The Nature Conservancy's impact investing unit called NatureVest. NatureVest was created in 2014 with founding sponsorship from JPMorgan Chase with the stated goal of sourcing and putting to work at least $1 billion of impact investment capital for measurable conservation outcomes over three years. For their work on the Seychelles debt restructuring, The Nature Conservancy and JPMorgan Chase were given the FT/ITC Transformational Business Award for Achievement in Transformational Finance. The award is given by the Financial Times and the World Bank's International Finance Corporation (IFC) for ground-breaking, commercially viable solutions to development challenges.

Plant a Billion Trees campaign
The Nature Conservancy's "Plant a Billion Trees" campaign is an effort to plant one billion trees across the globe in forests with the greatest need. The Nature Conservancy pledged to plant 25 million trees as part of the launch of the United Nations Environment Program (UNEP)'s Billion Tree Campaign. This campaign encourages individuals and organizations to plant their own trees around the world and record this action on the website as a tally.

Tree planting
The Nature Conservancy plants trees for every contribution donated by supporters. Its "Plant a Billion Trees" campaign aims to restore Brazil's Atlantic Forest by planting 1 billion native trees on 2.5 million acres that have been deforested.

Operations 
The Nature Conservancy has over one million members across the world . , it was the largest environmental non-profit organization by assets and revenue in the Americas.

Big business ties 
The Nature Conservancy has ties to many large companies, including those in the oil, gas, mining, chemical and agricultural industries. , its board of directors included the retired chairman of Duke Energy, and executives from Merck, HP, Google and several financial industry groups. It also has a Business Council which it describes as a consultative forum that includes Bank of America, BP America, Chevron, Coca-Cola, Dow Chemical, Duke Energy, General Mills, Royal Dutch Shell, and Starbucks. The organization faced criticism in 2010 from supporters for its refusal to cut ties with BP after the Gulf oil spill.

Writer and activist Naomi Klein has strongly criticized The Nature Conservancy for earning money from an oil well on land it controls in Texas and for its continued engagement with fossil fuel companies. The Nature Conservancy responded by arguing that it had no choice under the terms of a lease it signed years prior with an oil and gas company and later came to regret.

In 2020, Bloomberg published an article claiming that some of the companies (such as JPMorgan Chase, Disney, and BlackRock) that purchase carbon credits from The Nature Conservancy were purchasing carbon credits for forests that did not need protection.

In 2021, The Nature Conservancy partnered with Amazon to compensate local farmers for restoring and protecting rainforests in Para, Brazil. In 2022, a group of smaller non-profit organizations signed an open letter to the Conservancy’s CEO, Jennifer Morris, charging that The Nature Conservancy was overly supportive of logging interests and the use of tree planting as a natural climate solution.

Efficiency and accountability 

The Charity Navigator gave The Nature Conservancy a 3-star overall rating, a 2-star financial rating and a 4-star accountability and transparency rating, out of a maximum of four stars, for the 2019 fiscal year.

Hunting 
Like many large environmental groups such as the Sierra Club and the World Wildlife Fund, the Conservancy includes allowances for hunting and fishing within its management policies. The organization does not totally ban hunting or fishing but defers to state hunting and fishing regulations.

Publication
The organization publishes The Nature Conservancy magazine (six issues per year).

Resale 
There have been allegations of The Nature Conservancy obtaining land and reselling it at a profit, sometimes to supporters and sometimes to large organizations that allows them to claim tax breaks. The Nature Conservancy argues that the profit from such sales allows The Nature Conservancy to increase its preservation of what the Nature Conservancy claims are more important locations.

See also

Climate, Community & Biodiversity Alliance
List of environmental issues
List of environmental organizations
Natural capital
Natural environment
Natural landscape
Natural resource
Northwest Alliance
Private protected area
Sustainability

References

Bibliography
 Tercek, Mark R.; Adams, Jonathan (2013) "Nature's Fortune: How Business and Society Thrive by Investing in Nature". New York: Basic Books . 
 Grove, Noel; with photographs by Stephen J. Krasemann (1992). Preserving Eden: The Nature Conservancy. New York City: Harry N. Abrams, Inc. .
 Morine, David E. (1990). Good Dirt: Confessions of a Conservationist. Chester, Connecticut: Globe Pequot Press. .
 Birchard, Bill (2005). Nature's Keepers. San Francisco: Jossey-Bass (a Wiley imprint). .
 Stephens, Joe; Ottaway, David B. May 3, 2003). "Conservancy Scientists Question Their Role". The Washington Post. 
 Stephens, Joe; Ottaway, David B. (May 4, 2003). "$420,000 a Year and No-Strings Fund: Conservancy Underreported President's Pay and Perks of Office". The Washington Post.

External links

 
 Nature United
 Cool Green Science The Conservation Blog of The Nature Conservancy
 The Nature Conservancy's Geospatial Conservation Atlas
 Nature's Land Brokers Documentary produced by Idaho Public Television
 The Nature Conservancy at SourceWatch
 YouTube channel

 
Nature conservation organizations based in the United States
Environmental organizations based in Virginia
Land trusts in Virginia
Forest conservation organizations
Water organizations in the United States
Non-profit organizations based in Arlington, Virginia
Organizations established in 1951
Scientific organizations established in 1951
1951 establishments in the United States
1951 in the environment
 01
Shorty Award winners